Sir George Goodman (17 November 179113 October 1859) was an English wool-stapler, a magistrate for the borough and county of Leeds, as well as a Liberal politician. On 1 January 1836, he was elected the first Mayor of Leeds after the Municipal Corporations Act 1835, and he served as a Member of Parliament (MP) for Leeds from 1852 to 1857.

Early years
Goodman was born in Leeds, the son of Benjamin Goodman (d. 10 June 1848), a wool merchant, and his wife, Ann Radford. He was baptised at Leeds South Parade Baptist Church and remained a Baptist. He had at least one sibling, a sister Eleanor (1791–1877).

Career

Goodman started his career learning his father's business and becoming a partner in his father's firm of B. Goodman & Sons at 21 Hunslet Lane, Leeds. He prospered as a wool-stapler in Leeds and Bradford, and was a Director of the Leeds and Bradford Railway.  His firm acquired other local firms including, in 1846, Thomas Pearson and Sons, manufacturers of worsted.

He was elected Mayor of Leeds on 1 January 1836, the first Mayor of the City of Leeds after the Municipal Corporations Act. In April, he was presented a gold chain with an inscribed pendant to honour his mayoral election. Following the resignation of C. G. Maclea, Goodman was again elected mayor on 1 January 1847 and left office on 9 November 1847. He was re-elected for a third term on 9 November 1850, and a fourth term on 9 November 1851. He resigned from his position as mayor in March 1852 in order to be eligible to run for Parliament.

A Whig, Goodman was elected to Parliament with Matthew Talbot Baines in 1852. He was a magistrate of the West Riding of Yorkshire, and appointed a deputy lieutenant on 27 January 1853. In 1851, Goodman served as Leeds' civic representative at The Great Exhibition, after which, on 26 February 1852, he was knighted at Buckingham Palace, shortly before his resignation as mayor. Goodman sat for the Borough of Leeds in the House of Commons for five years, beginning at the 1852 general election, before retiring upon the 1857 dissolution of Parliament because of poor health brought about by a stroke of paralysis and neuralgia.

Personal life

Goodman was a member of the Leeds Philosophical and Literary Society. He once made a donation to the society of fourteen birds from Australia.  Although Goodman was recorded as  living at  Newton Hall estate in Potternewton, near Leeds  in 1846, he had  sold the estate to Arthur Lupton by 1845. Goodman never married.  The Gentleman's Magazine  reported that he died on 13 October 1859 at his seat, Roundhay, near Leeds aged 67. In compliance with Goodman's request, an autopsy was conducted, revealing softened spinal marrow. Goodman, a Baptist, was interred at Whitkirk Church.

He inherited his father's Roundhay estate, Goodman House,  which was renamed Beechwood by Arthur Lupton's brother, Francis Lupton, who had purchased the estate by 1860, following George's death.

In later life, Goodman had a portrait commissioned as 'George Goodman, Mayor', by Charles Henry Schwanfelder, also from Leeds and Animal Painter to King George III and King George IV. The portrait shows Goodman looking outward, in the attire of the period, sat at a desk overladened with books, with reading glasses in hand.

References

External links

Whig (British political party) MPs for English constituencies
Politicians from Leeds
English Baptists
UK MPs 1852–1857
Mayors of Leeds
Liberal Party (UK) MPs for English constituencies
Deputy Lieutenants of the West Riding of Yorkshire
Knights Bachelor
1791 births
1859 deaths
19th-century English businesspeople